The 1946 Texas Conference football season was the season of college football played by the member schools of the Texas Conference as part of the 1946 college football season. Abilene Christian and Southwestern (TX) tied for the conference championship. None of the Texas Conference teams was ranked in the Associated Press poll or played in a bowl game.

Conference overview

Teams

Abilene Christian

The 1946 Abilene Christian Wildcats football team represented Abilene Christian College now known as Abilene Christian University) as a member of the Texas Conference during the 1946 college football season. In their second non-consecutive year under head coach Tonto Coleman, and their first year after the end of World War II, the Wildcats compiled an 8–1–1 record (3–0–1 against conference opponents), outcored all opponents by a total of 228 to 53, and tied with Southwestern for the Texas Conference championship.

Southwestern

The 1946 Southwestern Pirates football team represented Southwestern College as a member of the Texas Conference during the 1946 college football season. In their eighth year under head coach Randolph M. Medley, Southwestern compiled an 5–4–1 record (3–0–1 against conference opponents), outscored all opponents by a total of 243 to 181, and tied with Abilene Christian for the Texas Conference championship.

McMurry

The 1946 McMurry Indians football team represented McMurry University as a member of the Texas Conference during the 1946 college football season. Led by head coach J. Vernon Hilliard, McMurray compiled a 4–4–1 record (2–4 against conference opponents), was outscored by a total of 138 to 82, and finished third in the Texas Conference.

Howard Payne

The 1946 Howard Payne Yellow Jackets football team represented Howard Payne University as a member of the Texas Conference during the 1946 college football season. Led by head coach Joe Bailey Cheaney, Howard Payne compiled a 2–5–2 record (1–3 against conference opponents), was outscored by a total of 125 to 85, and finished fourth in the Texas Conference.

Austin

The 1946 Austin Kangaroos football team represented Austin College as a member of the Texas Conference during the 1946 college football season. Led by head coach Garvice Steen, Austin compiled a 2–7–1 record (1–3 against conference opponents), was outscored by a total of 207 to 54, and finished last in the Texas Conference.

All-Texas Conference football team
The 1946 All-Texas Conference football team was selected by the conference coaches and announced on December 6, 1946. Abilene Christian and Southwestern each placed five players on the first team. The first-team selections were:

 Ends:
 Ted Barc, Southwestern
 Neal Bradshaw, McMurry

 Tackles: 
 Willard Paine, Abilene Christian
 Dan Davenport, Southwestern

 Guards:
 Charles Floyd, Abilene Christian
 Max Jones, Southwestern

 Center:
 Dick Stovall, Abilene Christian

 Backs:
 Lawrence Dixon, Abilene Christian
 Joe Evans, Southwestern
 V. T. Smith, Abilene Christian
 Floren Hooefer (tie), McMurry
 Frank Means (tie), Southwestern

References